Transportation Act may refer to:

Great Britain
 Transportation Act of 1718

United States
 Transportation Act of 1958
 Transportation Act of 2005